Stilon Gorzów Wielkopolski, is a Polish football club based in Gorzów Wielkopolski, Poland.

History
The club emerged in 1961, a year after decrease with from II league ZKS Stilon. In the 1991–92 Polish Cup, they reached the semi-finals. It expected nobody in July 1996, that it will resign from section of football club Stilon. It has emerged from July after resigning from section 1996 football club Gorzowski.
On 30 April 2011 the club was officially disbanded. The reason were financial problems, mainly not enough money for player's payment. It was because of all money for Gorzów Wielkopolski's sport clubs support were invested in new speedway track for Stal Gorzów Wielkopolski. As the result Gorzów's clubs of football, basketball and swimmers were left without financial support from city president. Few weeks later team was reborn with new players and staff under the name of "KS Stilon Gorzów".

Staff

Former managers

External links
 

 
Football clubs in Poland
Association football clubs established in 1947
1947 establishments in Poland